"Cambodia" is the fourth single by British singer Kim Wilde. It was released at the end of 1981; a year in which Wilde had already scored three highly successful hit singles and a best-selling debut album. The single was another international success, topping the charts in France, Sweden and Switzerland and hitting the top ten in several other nations. It was released on the 7" format but also as a 12" single in West Germany, although not in a remixed or extended version. The B-side of both releases was an exclusive non-album track called "Watching for Shapes".

"Cambodia" was later included on Wilde's second album, Select, which was released six months after the single in May 1982. The album version of "Cambodia" runs for 7:13 minutes, as it is teamed with a more uptempo instrumental version of the song, called "Reprise".

Musically and lyrically, "Cambodia" showed a change in direction for Wilde from the new wave feel of her debut album. The song was mainly synth-driven, with east Asian-sounding percussion.

Composition

"Cambodia" was written by Marty Wilde and Ricki Wilde and has a length of seven minutes and thirteen seconds. The Independents Chris Mugan found the song reminiscent of a film noir. Stewart Mason of AllMusic noted that the song lacks the bubblegum pop influence present on Wilde's self-titled debut album, and is instead more synthesizer-driven. Matt James of PopMatters felt that the song was an attempt by Kim Wilde to prove that she could tackle serious issues, leading the way for The Human League's "The Lebanon" in 1984 and Sting's "Russians" in 1985.

Critical reception
According to Yahoo!, songs like "Cambodia", "View from a Bridge" (1982) and Wilde's version of "You Keep Me Hangin' On" (1986) brought her "very close to [the] hearts" of Australians. The Independents Chris Mugan deemed the song one of Wilde's "eighties classics" alongside "Kids in America". In the Encyclopedia of Popular Music, Colin Larkin opined that Wilde tried "a more adventurous sound" with "Cambodia," indicating that she was "an exciting talent." The Ipswich Star Wayne Savage said that "Cambodia" and "Chequered Love" (1981) are "seminal smashes" which prove that Wilde "struck gold more often than not." Vogue Rachel Hahn called the song an "underrated classic".

Stewart Mason of AllMusic noted that "Kim Wilde's second album didn't score any hits on the level of the debut's 'Kids in America,' although the dramatic 'Cambodia' was a sort of cult favorite in some circles." Writing for the same website, John Bush called the track a "fan favorite" and an "odd, chilling attempt to record a dirge for Southeastern Asia." In The Legacies of Jean-Luc Godard, Douglas Morrey wrote that "'Cambodia' is not...a particularly moving record". In his review of The Singles Collection 1981–1993 in All Music Guide to Rock: The Definitive Guide to Rock, Pop, and Soul, Mike DeGagne wrote that "Only the unbecoming 'Cambodia' and the hollowed out 'Child Come Away' should be avoided on this collection, as both lack the spirit that Wilde usually packs."

Track listing
 "Cambodia" (3:56)
 "Watching for Shapes" (3:42)

Charts

Weekly charts

Year-end charts

Cover versions

 German DJ Pulsedriver released a cover of the song in 2001 and a remake in 2013.
 Apoptygma Berzerk's 2005 album You and Me Against the World includes a cover version of the song.
 The Swedish Death'N'Roll band Hearse released a cover of the song in 2004 on their album Armageddon, Mon Amour.
 An Italian house remix of the song was featured in the 2005 compilation album by Gigi D'Agostino, Disco Tanz.
 The German dance group Scooter covered the song on their 2007 album Jumping All Over the World. Jumpstyle artist Vorwerk also covered this song.
 In 2008 Serbian punk rock band Six Pack recorded a version on their cover album Discover.
 In 2009 Dutch DJ Marco V released a track called "Coma Aid" incorporating a re-recorded version of the song's main synthesizer tune.
 In 2017 punk rock band Brutto covered the song on their third album Roki.
 In 2019 hardstyle producers Ran-D, Frequencerz, and Adaro made a cover named "Battleborn".
 In 2019 Dimitri Vegas & Like Mike, in collaboration with the Dutch-Turkish DJ Ummet Ozcan and the Dutch DJ Brennan Heart, released a bigroom and hardstyle cover of the song with the name, "Beast (All as One)".
 In 2020 Kim's father Marty Wilde recorded his own version of the song for his album "Running Together"
 In 2020 Ukrainian dance music band Soundstream released a bigroom/EDM cover of this song.

References

1981 singles
1981 songs
Cambodia in fiction
Songs of the Vietnam War
European Hot 100 Singles number-one singles
Jumpstyle songs
Kim Wilde songs
Number-one singles in Sweden
Number-one singles in Switzerland
RAK Records singles
Songs about Asia
Songs written by Marty Wilde
Songs written by Ricky Wilde